Guido Andreozzi was the defending champion but lost in the first round to Lorenzo Giustino.

Márton Fucsovics won the title after defeating Laslo Đere 4–6, 7–6(9–7), 6–2 in the final.

Seeds

Draw

Finals

Top half

Bottom half

External Links
Main Draw
Qualifying Draw

Internazionali di Tennis Citta di Vicenza - Singles
2017 Singles
Internazionali di Tennis Citta di Vicenza